Dale R. Johnston is a Canadian curler.

Teams

References

External links
 
 Dale Johnston – Curling Canada Stats Archive

Living people
Canadian male curlers
Curlers from Alberta
Brier champions
Year of birth missing (living people)